Chaplain (Major General) Norris Leonard Einertson, USA (born August 6, 1930) is a retired American Army officer who served as the 17th Chief of Chaplains of the United States Army from 1986 to 1990. Einertson held degrees from Luther Theological Seminary and New York Theological Seminary. He was endorsed by the Evangelical Lutheran Church in America.

Awards and decorations

References

Further reading

1930 births
Living people
United States Army generals
United States Army personnel of the Vietnam War
Recipients of the Legion of Merit
Chiefs of Chaplains of the United States Army
Vietnam War chaplains
Deputy Chiefs of Chaplains of the United States Army
20th-century American clergy